Human Neolithic settlements by date:

See also 
 Copper Age state societies
 Neolithic Revolution
 List of Mesolithic settlements

References 

Settlements
Neolithic settlements
Archaeology-related lists